Smoky Mountain Melody is a 1948 American musical Western film directed by Ray Nazarro, and starring Roy Acuff, Guinn 'Big Boy' Williams, Russell Arms, Sybil Merritt, Tommy Ivo, and Jason Robards Sr. The film was released by Columbia Pictures on December 16, 1948.

Plot

Cast
Roy Acuff as himself
Guinn 'Big Boy' Williams as Saddle Grease Williams
Russell Arms as Bruce 'Kid' Corby
Sybil Merritt as Mary Files
Tommy Ivo as Tommy Durkin
Jason Robards Sr. as Josh Corby
Harry Cheshire as Doc Moffitt 
Fred F. Sears as Mr. Crump
Trevor Bardette as Uncle McCorkle
Tommy Magness as Musician
Jock Mahoney as Buckeye
Lonnie Wilson as Musician
John Elliott as Englesby
Ralph Littlefield as Masters
Sam Flint as Brandon
Eddie Acuff as Jenkins
Jack Ellis as Jones
Heinie Conklin as Bo
Olin Howland as Lum Peters
Pete Kirby as Musician
Jimmy Riddle as Musician
Joe Zinkan as Musician
The Smoky Mountain Boys as Roy Acuff Band
Carolina Cotton as Perky Durkin (uncredited)

References

External links

1940s Western (genre) musical films
American Western (genre) musical films
1948 films
American black-and-white films
Columbia Pictures films
Films directed by Ray Nazarro
1940s American films